The 1957 South Dakota State Jackrabbits football team was an American football team that represented South Dakota State University in the North Central Conference (NCC) during the 1957 NCAA College Division football season. In its 11th season under head coach Ralph Ginn, the team compiled a 6–2–1 record, won the NCC championship, and outscored opponents by a total of 185 to 119. 

The team's statistical leaders included Jim Vacura with 455 rushing yards and Ron LaVallee with 603 passing yards. Guard Len Spanjers was selected as the NCC's Most Valuable Player. Other key players included end Ellis Jenson, tackle Wayne Haensel, and backs Al Breske and Ron LaVallee.

Schedule

References

South Dakota State
South Dakota State Jackrabbits football seasons
North Central Conference football champion seasons
South Dakota State Jackrabbits football